Domenico Bernardo Zilotti (ca. 1730 - ca. 1780 or 1795) was a Venetian engraver.

Life
Along with Francesco Zuccarelli, he completed a set of engravings on military subjects based on works by Francesco Simonini. Some of his etchings have also been attributed to Marco Ricci.

References

1630s births
Year of death unknown
Italian engravers